Ya is a letter of related and vertically oriented alphabets used to write Mongolic and Tungusic languages.

Mongolian language 

 Transcribes Chakhar ; Khalkha . Transliterated into Cyrillic with the letter .
 The unhooked  initial and medial forms are older ones.
 Derived from Old Uyghur yodh, through borrowed Manchu hooked yodh.
 Produced with  using the Windows Mongolian keyboard layout.
 In the Mongolian Unicode block,  comes after  and before .

Notes

References 

Articles containing Mongolian script text
Mongolic letters
Mongolic languages
Tungusic languages